"The Goonies 'R' Good Enough" is a song by American singer Cyndi Lauper. It was released as a single in 1985, and is from the soundtrack of the film The Goonies. It was her fifth top-10 single on the US Billboard Hot 100.

Background
Before its inclusion on The Essential Cyndi Lauper in 2003, the song did not appear on any of Lauper's albums or the 1994 compilation Twelve Deadly Cyns...and Then Some. Lauper admitted in an interview with Matthew Rettenmund that she hated the song, which was why she had chosen not to include it on her first compilation.

The song has been covered by several artists, such as Bombones, Haruko Momoi, The Advantage, New Found Glory, Radical Face, Minibosses, and Tomoyuki Uchida. The song was featured in several iterations of Konami's Goonies video games, most notably The Goonies for the Famicom and The Goonies II for the Nintendo Entertainment System. It was also featured in an instrumental version in Pop'n Music 10.

Steven Spielberg had made Lauper the musical director for the Goonies soundtrack. She sought out new bands to be included on the project including her friends, the Bangles.

Lauper originally titled the song simply "Good Enough", but it was changed by Warner Bros., who wanted the title of the film to be part of the song title for marketing reasons.

Lauper refused to play the song live after 1987. She finally incorporated it back into her live show during several dates in Australia in 2004. Fans kept requesting the song and Lauper eventually sang the first verse and chorus a cappella. She has since incorporated the song back into her live set, due to overwhelming fan recognition.

In 2012, Lauper performed a parody version entitled "Taffy Butt" for the second season premiere episode of the Fox animated television series Bob's Burgers; the episode is an homage to The Goonies. Her son, a fan of the series, insisted she record the new version.

In 2014, "The Goonies 'R' Good Enough" was heavily featured in a The Goonies-themed episode of the ABC comedy series The Goldbergs.

Composition
The song's length is 3 minutes and 38 seconds. It was written in the key of E major with 139 beats per minute.

Reception
Cash Box said that the song "captures a wealth of true feeling within a superficial setting."

Music video
There was also a two-part video shot for this song featuring World Wrestling Federation pro-wrestlers Captain Lou Albano, Roddy Piper, Wendi Richter, The Fabulous Moolah, The Iron Sheik, Nikolai Volkoff, Freddie Blassie and André the Giant (part 2 only); Steven Spielberg; David Wolff (Lauper's manager); The Goonies cast (except for Kerri Green, Anne Ramsey, Joe Pantoliano, Robert Davi and John Matuszak); and the then relatively unknown Bangles as a group of female pirates. Lauper's mother appears as "Catrina, Cyndi's mother" and the "sea hag".

Part 1 of the video debuted on MTV before The Goonies opened in theaters and Part 2 premiered on MTV after the movie opened. On the DVD of The Goonies, both parts have been spliced together to form one video with no chapter change in the middle of the two. Part 1 of the music video had an extended version released in Japan. The version included more commentary from the voice over during the opening sequence of the video and extended scenes inside the gas station and with the wrestlers. Part 1 of the video almost did not make it onto the DVD due to Warner Bros.' inability to find the broadcast master tape. Warner was ready to start pressing the DVD when someone at VH1 found an unused mastered broadcast copy of the tape that was sent to their network. In the nick of time, it was digitized and put on the DVD before pressing began. The music video was shot on film then edited and mastered on video tape for broadcast.

Plot
Cyndi Lauper's character, referred to as Cyndi, works at her parents' gas station, along with her friends Dave (Wolff) and Wendi (Richter). Cyndi's Mom is baking cookies for gas station customers, and Wendi operates a vegetable stand (set up inside a miniature wrestling ring) outside the station. A group of creditors (Piper, Blassie, Sheik, and Volkoff) show up to evict them and take over the station. While they argue with Mom and Pop (Albano), an old woman (Moolah) shows up and closes down Wendi's vegetable stand, putting in a Benihana-like set-up in its place. While packing, Cyndi removes a picture from the wall, which reveals the entrance to a cavern. Searching through the cave, Cyndi finds a treasure map and then encounters the Goonies (minus the character of Andy), who also have a copy of the map.

Soon after, they encounter a group of pirates (who look just like the creditors, though it is never said if they are the same people as the creditors), and a supposed green-faced witch. Cyndi runs away as the Goonies are captured by the pirates. Running through the caverns, she encounters several skeletons and even some chefs who seem to work for the restaurant Benihana. Cyndi eventually finds herself trapped between the pirates and the green-faced witch on a log bridge. Unsure what to do, she cries out: "Steven Spielberg, how do I get out of this one?" The scene cuts to Spielberg in an editing room, apparently in the midst of editing the video as it is happening. Spielberg stops the editing machine and begins to give a solution, before realizing that he does not know how to help Cyndi.

Cyndi, along with the Goonies, is captured and taken aboard a pirate ship. The pirates, along with the green-faced witch and some female pirates (the Bangles), party, while forcing the Goonies and Cyndi to prepare food for them. Dave and Wendi (who had also gone into the cave to look for Cyndi) have also been captured, and are tied to the mast of the ship. Eventually, Cyndi, Dave, Wendi, and the Goonies break free, and after finding some treasure on the ship, toss some of it to the pirates, who fight amongst themselves for it. After subduing the green-faced witch, the Goonies escape from the ship along with Cyndi and her friends, giving her the remaining treasure that they found.

Cyndi, along with Dave and Wendi, returns through the cavern entrance in the gas station, armed with the extra treasure in hopes of appeasing the creditors. Despite all the treasure she offers, they still refuse. Cyndi then whistles, and in a cloud of smoke, André the Giant appears, and chases the creditors off (with Roddy Piper apparently breaking character, calling out to director Richard Donner, Spielberg, as well as Lauper and Wolff that "the video wasn't supposed to end like this" while being pursued by André). The family then celebrates its good fortune.

Track listing
7" single
 "The Goonies 'R' Good Enough" - 3:27
 "What a Thrill" - 3:00

U.S. 12" single
 "The Goonies 'R' Good Enough" (Dance Remix) - 5:25
 "The Goonies 'R' Good Enough" (Dub Version) - 5:29

UK 12" single
 "The Goonies 'R' Good Enough" (Dance Remix) - 5:25
 "The Goonies 'R' Good Enough" (Dub Version) - 5:29
 "What a Thrill" - 3:00

Charts

Weekly charts

Year-end charts

Certifications

In other media
 On September 12, 1985, the song was played in an episode of the ABC daytime television soap opera General Hospital.
 On March 4, 2014, the song was played in an episode of the ABC prime-time comedy series The Goldbergs.

References

External links 
 

The Goonies
1985 songs
1985 singles
Cyndi Lauper songs
Songs about fictional characters
Oricon International Singles Chart number-one singles
Songs written by Cyndi Lauper
Songs written for films
Portrait Records singles